King Fahd's Fountain, also known as the Jeddah Fountain, is in Jeddah, Saudi Arabia. It is the tallest fountain of its type in the world.

Overview
The fountain was donated to the city of Jeddah by King Fahd, hence its name. It was constructed between 1980 and 1983 and was launched in 1985.

King Fahd's Fountain is listed in Guinness World Records as the highest water fountain in the world.

The fountain is visible throughout the vicinity of Jeddah. The fountain uses saltwater taken from the Red Sea instead of freshwater. Over 500 LED spotlights illuminate the fountain at night.

History
The fountain was initially built between 1980 and 1983, and was inspired by the Geneva Fountain (length 140 meters, pumping speed 124 mph), but the planners were not satisfied with the height. The fountain was then operated in its current form in 1985 to pump sea water at a speed of 233 miles per hour to a height of 312 meters (1024 feet).

Team Red Bull Air Force base jumper Othar Lawrence set a global record by making a historic jump along the fountain.

Design

The base of the fountain is in the form of a large mabkhara, an incense burner which symbolizes Arabian culture. Since the fountain pumps sea water, rust and corrosion were the main concerns of those who built it. Before reaching the pump, the water passes through several filters to purify it from dirt, sand and organic matter. The fountain is lit by 500 high-light LEDs designed to withstand the continuous fall of thousands of tons of water from hundreds of metres. These spotlights are installed on special islands.

See also
 
 List of things named after Saudi kings

References

External link
 

1985 establishments in Saudi Arabia
Buildings and structures in Jeddah
Fountains in Saudi Arabia
Tourist attractions in Jeddah